"Chains" is a song written by Hal Bynum and Bud Reneau, and recorded by American country music artist Patty Loveless.  It was released in December 1989 as the fifth single from her album Honky Tonk Angel.

Background
"Chains" was Loveless's second career No. 1 hit, with both this song and the earlier "Timber I'm Falling In Love" coming from Honky Tonk Angel.

In its original form, the song had a much slower tempo than the one recorded by Loveless. Tony Brown, one of her producers at the time, decided to speed up the tempo for the arrangement she recorded.

The song charted for 26 weeks on the Billboard Hot Country Singles and Tracks chart, reaching No. 1 during the week of March 10, 1990.

Charts

Weekly charts

Year-end charts

References

Whitburn, Joel, "Top Country Songs: 1944-2005," 2006.

1989 singles
Patty Loveless songs
Song recordings produced by Tony Brown (record producer)
Songs written by Hal Bynum
MCA Nashville Records singles
Music videos directed by John Lloyd Miller
1988 songs